Colfax stewensi is a species of beetle in the family Carabidae; it is the only species in the genus Colfax.

References

Anthiinae (beetle)
Beetles described in 1920